Stephen Robert Litzow (born 1961) is an American politician who served as a member of the Washington State Senate, representing the 41st district from 2010 to 2017. A liberal Republican, his district includes the affluent Seattle suburbs of Bellevue, Beaux Arts Village, Mercer Island, Newcastle, and parts of Issaquah, Sammamish, and Renton in King County. Litzow is widely seen as a centrist. He was defeated by Democrat Lisa Wellman in the 2016 election.

Committee assignments

Chair, Senate Early Learning and K-12 Education Committee
Energy Environment & Telecommunications Committee
Transportation Committee

Background
Litzow resides on Mercer Island and is a graduate of Northwestern University. He was twice elected to the city council before being chosen in 2010 to represent Washington's 41st Legislative District in the State Senate. Litzow was a Procter & Gamble executive and a business consultant before being elected to the Senate.

References 

 Washington State Senate
 About Steve Litzow
 Senate Republican Campaign Committee

1961 births
Living people
Northwestern University alumni
People from Mercer Island, Washington
Procter & Gamble people
Republican Party Washington (state) state senators
21st-century American politicians